Kara Grant (born January 9, 1979) is a two-time Olympic modern pentathlete from Canada. She is one of the first female Canadian modern pentathletes, along with Monica Pinette, to compete at the 2004 Summer Olympics in Athens, Greece.

Born and raised in Charlottetown, Prince Edward Island, Grant started out her sporting career in modern pentathlon at the age of sixteen. Although she joined in a local fencing club, Grant was intrigued by the challenge and variety of five different sporting disciplines (shooting, fencing, swimming, horse-riding, and running), which ultimately made her decision to try and accomplish the sport. In 1999, Grant received a qualifying berth for the Pan American Games in Winnipeg, Manitoba, where she took home the bronze medal for her national team. Following her well-accomplished result, she spent five years of training and competition before was able to break through into the international scene in 2002, when she added her first individual bronze medal at the Pan American Championships in Rio de Janeiro, Brazil. She also graduated from the University of Prince Edward Island with a Bachelor of Science degree in 2002

Grant qualified for the 2004 Summer Olympics in Athens, as one of the first female Canadian modern-pentathletes, and competed in the women's event, where she finished only in twenty-second place. She also produced her first top-ten finish at the 2006 World Modern Pentathlon Championships in Guatemala City, Guatemala, and nearly missed out the medal podium at the 2007 Pan American Games in Rio de Janeiro, finishing abruptly in fourth place. Following her highest achievements in the international scene, Grant competed at her second Olympics in Beijing in 2008, and finished thirty-first in the women's event.

Shortly after the Olympics, Grant retired from her sporting career, and worked as a motivational and public speaker.

References

External links
 
  (archived page from Pentathlon.org)
 Canadian Olympic Team Profile

1979 births
Living people
Canadian female modern pentathletes
Olympic modern pentathletes of Canada
Modern pentathletes at the 2007 Pan American Games
Modern pentathletes at the 2004 Summer Olympics
Modern pentathletes at the 2008 Summer Olympics
Pan American Games bronze medalists for Canada
Sportspeople from Charlottetown
Pan American Games medalists in modern pentathlon
Modern pentathletes at the 1999 Pan American Games
Medalists at the 1999 Pan American Games
UPEI Panthers players
Laval Rouge et Or athletes